Pipeworks Studios is an American video game developer based in Eugene, Oregon. The company was founded in November 1999 by Dan White and Dan Duncalf and works to provide full development, co-development, and live operations to video game publishers and other partners, in addition to creating original IPs.

History 
Pipeworks Software was founded in Eugene, Oregon, in November 1999 by Dan White and Dan Duncalf, two developers formerly of Dynamix. White and Duncalf assumed the roles of chief technical officer and president, respectively, and Phil Cowles was hired as director of business development. On April 12, 2005, it was announced that Pipeworks had been acquired by Foundation 9 Entertainment, a video game conglomerate company founded the month prior. Subsequently, Duncalf joined Foundation 9's board of directors. By May 2010, Pipeworks had 60 employees. In September 2014, under advisory from GP Bullhound, Foundation 9 sold Pipeworks to Italian game publishing company Digital Bros. By February 2016, Pipeworks employed 75 people and had changed its name to Pipeworks Studio. In September 2020, Sumo Group acquired Pipeworks for $100 million. Together with its new parent company, the studio opened a subsidiary, Timbre Games, in Canada under the management of Joe Nickolls.

In July 2022, Pipeworks Studios was acquired by Jagex, developers of the RuneScape franchise.

Games developed

References

External links 
 

Companies based in Eugene, Oregon
Video game companies established in 1999
Video game companies of the United States
Video game development companies
1999 establishments in Oregon
2005 mergers and acquisitions
2014 mergers and acquisitions
2018 mergers and acquisitions
2020 mergers and acquisitions
2022 mergers and acquisitions
American subsidiaries of foreign companies
American companies established in 1999
Sumo Group